Chehreh Barq (also known as Chehreh Saraq, Churabara, and Chūrabūr) is a village in Yurchi-ye Gharbi Rural District, Kuraim District, Nir County, Ardabil Province, Iran. At the 2006 census, its population was 75, in 17 families.

References 

Tageo

Towns and villages in Nir County